Melghiribacillus  is a Gram-positive, spore-forming and aerobic genus of bacteria from the family of Bacillaceae with one known species (Melghiribacillus thermohalophilus). Melghiribacillus thermohalophilus was isolated from soil from a salt lake from Chott Melghir.

References

Bacillaceae
Bacteria genera
Monotypic bacteria genera